Arkas may refer to one of the following:

 Arkas, the Greek comics artist
 Arcas, the son of Zeus and Kallisto
 Arkas (planet) or HD 81688 b, an exoplanet
 Arkas, Republic of Dagestan, a rural locality in Dagestan, Russia
 Arkas Spor, professional volleyball team based in Izmir, Turkey
 Arkas Container Transport, a Turkish shipping line
 Mykola Arkas (1853–1909), Ukrainian composer, writer, and historian

See also 
 Arka (disambiguation)